Richard Alden "Rick" Griffin (June 18, 1944 – August 18, 1991) was an American artist and one of the leading designers of psychedelic posters in the 1960s. As a contributor to the underground comix movement, his work appeared regularly in Zap Comix. Griffin was closely identified with the Grateful Dead, designing some of their best-known posters and album covers such as Aoxomoxoa. His work within the surfing subculture included both film posters and his comic strip, Murphy.

Early life
Griffin was born near Palos Verdes amidst the surfing culture of southern California. Griffin biographer Tim Stephenson notes:
"His father was an engineer and amateur archaeologist and as a boy Rick accompanied him on digs in the Southwest. It was during this time that Rick was exposed to the Native American and ghost town artifacts that were to influence his later work. Rick was taught to surf by Randy Nauert at the age of 14 at Torrance Beach. The pair had met at Alexander  Jr. High, and were to become lifelong friends, Rick producing much of the artwork for Randy's future band, the Challengers."

While attending Nathaniel Narbonne High School in the Harbor City area of Los Angeles, he produced numerous surfer drawings, which led to his surfing comic strip, "Murphy" for Surfer magazine in 1961, with Griffin's character featured on the front cover the following year. In 1964, he left Surfer and briefly attended Chouinard Art Institute (now CalArts), where he met his future wife, artist Ida Pfefferle. That same year, he hung out with the group of artists and musicians known as the Jook Savages.

Career

Posters
He traveled with Ida on a Mexican surfing trip and later planned a move to San Francisco after seeing the psychedelic rock posters designed by Stanley Mouse and Alton Kelley. In late 1966, the couple arrived in San Francisco, where they first lived in their van before moving to Elsie Street in the Bernal Heights district. In the mid-1960s, he participated in Ken Kesey's Acid Tests. His first art exhibition was for the Jook Savages, celebrating the one-year anniversary of the Psychedelic Shop on Haight Street. Organizers for the Human Be-In saw his work and asked him to design a poster for their January 1967 event. Chet Helms was also impressed by Griffin's work and asked him to design posters for the Family Dog dance concerts at the Avalon Ballroom, which led Griffin to create concert posters for the Charlatans. In 1967, Griffin, Kelley, Mouse, Victor Moscoso and Wes Wilson teamed as the founders of Berkeley Bonaparte, a company that created and marketed psychedelic posters. In the fall of 1967 through the end of the year, Griffin also created posters for Chet Helms's The Family Dog Denver ballroom in Denver, CO.

Griffin returned to Southern California in 1969, eventually settling in San Clemente.

Comix 
Griffin was a regular contributor to Zap Comix, with his work appearing in issues #2, 3, 5–7, and 11–12. He contributed to all five issues of the comics zine Promethean Enterprises (1969–1974) and created Man from Utopia, a hybrid of illustration and comix printed by the San Francisco Comic Book Company in 1972.

Griffin also had comix work in Yellow Dog (1969–1969), Snatch Comics (1968), Bogeyman Comics (1969–1970), Jiz Comics (1969), San Francisco Comic Book (1970), Tales from the Tube (1972), and Zam (Zap Jam) (1974). His work appeared in the 1980s  in Gates of Eden (1982) and Blab! (1986).

The Gospel of John
Griffin became a born again Christian in November 1970, which led to fundamental changes in his lifestyle and in the style and content of his art. His 1973 painting Sail on Sailor for the band Mustard Seed Faith is an example of his fine art painting from this period. His most significant 1970s project was the creation of hundreds of paintings and drawings for The Gospel of John, published by the Christian record label Maranatha! Music. He also produced much album art for Maranatha! during the 1970s and 1980s.

Death and legacy
Rick Griffin died shortly after a motorcycle accident on August 15, 1991, in Petaluma, California. He was thrown from his Harley-Davidson motorcycle when he collided with a van that suddenly turned left as he attempted to pass it. He was not wearing a helmet and sustained major head injuries. He died three days later, on August 18, in nearby Santa Rosa Memorial Hospital, at the age of 47.

His work has been cited as an inspiration by surrealistic artists Roger Dean, known for his designs for bands such as Yes and Asia, as well as Mark Wilkinson, known for his designs for bands such as Marillion, Judas Priest and Iron Maiden.

Books
McClelland, Gordon. The Art of Rick Griffin. Perigee Paper Tiger, 1980. Reprinted by Last Gasp, 2001.
Harvey, Doug, edited by Susan Anderson. Heart and Torch: Rick Griffin's Transcendence. Laguna Art Museum, Gingko Press, 2007.

References

External links
 Rick Griffin's official website
 Smithsonian American Art Museum: Rick Griffin

1944 births
1991 deaths
Album-cover and concert-poster artists
Albums with cover art by Rick Griffin
American comics artists
American comic strip cartoonists
Psychedelic artists
American poster artists
Road incident deaths in California
Underground cartoonists
Motorcycle road incident deaths
History of San Francisco
People from Palos Verdes, California
Inkpot Award winners
Christian comics creators